Bunya Creek is a rural locality in the Fraser Coast Region, Queensland, Australia. In the  Bunya Creek had a population of 79 people.

History 
Bunya Creek Provisional School opened circa 1881. On 1 January 1909 it became Bunya Creek State School. It closed in 1928 due to low student numbers.

Urangan Road State School opened on 22 February 1915. In 1956 it was renamed Bingham Road State School. It closed on 1960. Despite the name, the school was 847 Booral Road (formerly Nikenbah Bingham Road) in Bunya Creek.

On Sunday 4 February 1917 Christ Church was officially opened by the Anglican Archdeacon of Toowoomba on Urangan Road, adjacent to the Urangan Road School.

In the  Bunya Creek had a population of 79 people.

References 

Fraser Coast Region
Localities in Queensland